Coudersport Area Junior/Senior High School is a small, rural public high school in Coudersport, the county seat of Potter County, along US Route 6. In 2015, enrollment was reported as 364 pupils in 7th through 12th grades. The school employed teachers. The school serves the Borough of Coudersport and the southern and western portions of Allegany Township, Eulalia Township, Hebron Township, Homer Township, Summit Township and Sweden Township. Coudersport Area Junior Senior High School is the sole junior high school and the sole high school operated by the Coudersport Area School District.

High school students may choose to attend Seneca Highlands Career and Technical Center for training in: the culinary arts, allied health services, automotive mechanics as well as construction and mechanical trades. The school is located in neighboring McKean County. The Seneca Highlands Intermediate Unit IU9 provides Coudersport Area School District with a wide variety of services including specialized education for disabled students and hearing, speech and visual disability services as well as professional development for staff and faculty.

Extracurriculars
Coudersport Area School District offers a wide variety of clubs, activities and an extensive sports program. The district has a Cooperative Sports Agreement with Austin Area School District which allows Autin area students to participate in the district's sports programs.

Student activities
The following student activities are available:
 Drama Club
 Falcon newspaper
 FFA
 Interact
 National Honor Society
 Student Council
 Varsity Club
 Yearbook

Music Department clubs
 Jazz Ensemble
 Marching Band
 Music Council
 Show Choir

Athletics
Coudersport participates in PIAA  District IX:

References

External links

Public high schools in Pennsylvania
Buildings and structures in Potter County, Pennsylvania
Education in Potter County, Pennsylvania
Public middle schools in Pennsylvania